Beling is a surname. Notable people with the surname include:

Fernanda Neves Beling (born 1982), Brazilian basketball player 
Geoffrey Beling (1907–1992), Sri Lankan artist and educator
Helen Beling (1914–2001), American sculptor
John Kingsman Beling (1919–2010), United States Navy Rear Admiral
Maria Beling (1915–1994), German soprano and actress
William Wright Beling II (1867–1928), Sri Lankan painter
Michael Sigmund Beling  (1967–Present), Chicago author and marketing engineer